The Antoine de Saint-Exupéry class is a series of three container ships built for CMA CGM. The ships have a maximum theoretical capacity of 20,954 TEU. The ships were built by Hanjin Heavy Industries and Construction Philippines.

List of ships

See also 

 Jacques Saadé-class container ship
 Explorer-class container ship
 A. Lincoln-class container ship

References 

Container ship classes
Ships of CMA CGM